James Reilly (1861–?) was a Major League Baseball player who played second base for the 1885 New York Metropolitans.

External links

1861 births
Major League Baseball second basemen
Baseball players from New York (state)
New York Metropolitans players
19th-century baseball players
Newark Domestics players
Year of death missing